National Highway 527D (NH 527D) is a  National Highway in India.

References

National highways in India
National Highways in Bihar